A bronze sculpture of Alben W. Barkley is installed in the Kentucky State Capitol, in Frankfort, Kentucky, United States.

External links
 

Buildings and structures in Frankfort, Kentucky
Monuments and memorials in Kentucky
Sculptures of men in Kentucky
Statues in Kentucky
Bronze sculptures in Kentucky
Alben W. Barkley